Tom Czyz is an American former homicide detective, police officer, and SWAT team operator. He is the founder and chief executive officer of Armoured One, a safety and security company with its focuses on active shooter training, security assessments, security glass and security film. He is an active shooter expert who advises and conducts training programs for teachers and administrators at schools K-12, universities and businesses across the country. Tom is the son of Pastor Randy and Maryann Czyz who pastor Word of Life Assembly of God in Baldwinsville, New York.

Early life
Tom was born in Syracuse, New York and currently lives in Baldwinsville. He is a graduate of Baker High School in Baldwinsville, NY. Tom grew up in downstate NY in Highland Falls.  Tom's father was a chaplain at West Point, NY for the Army.

Career
Tom started his career as a police office for the Baldwinsville Police Department. In 2009 he transferred to the Onondaga County Sheriff's Department as a major crimes detective  and SWAT Team Operator.  He served for a total 18 years before medical retiring from an injury on duty. He is now a retired major crimes detective and SWAT Team operator. On December 14, 2012, Tom founded Armoured One with a team of active shooter experts from SWAT Team members, elite military personnel, and federal agents which include the Secret Service, FBI and Homeland Security.
Tom and his team evaluates the security of schools, sells UL Shooter Attack Certified glass and window film plus he delivers active shooter training for schools. The idea of Armoured One came up when he realized after the Sandy Hook attack in 2012 that he could not keep his own kids safe while they were at school.

His team travels across the country and teaches faculty and staff on what to do in the event of a school shooting.

See also
 John P. St. John (police officer)
 Detective

References

External links
Czyz

Living people
Year of birth missing (living people)
American businesspeople
People from Syracuse, New York
People from Baldwinsville, New York